In mathematics, the Barnes–Wall lattice Λ16, discovered by Eric Stephen Barnes and G. E. (Tim) Wall, is the 16-dimensional positive-definite even integral lattice of discriminant 28 with no norm-2 vectors. It is the sublattice of the Leech lattice fixed by a certain automorphism of order 2, and is analogous to the Coxeter–Todd lattice.

The automorphism group of the Barnes–Wall lattice has order 89181388800 = 221 35 52 7 and has structure 21+8 PSO8+(F2).  There are 4320 vectors of norm 4 in the Barnes–Wall lattice (the shortest nonzero vectors in this lattice).

References

External links
Barnes–Wall lattice at Sloane's lattice catalogue.

Quadratic forms